are a Japanese kayōkyoku group, formed by Hiroshi Uchiyamada (born Michio Uchiyamada, 1936–2006) in 1967 and fronted by the lead vocalist Kiyoshi Maekawa.

In 1969, the group debuted with the 11th Japan Record Award-winning song "Nagasaki wa Kyou mo Ame datta". They enjoyed a highly successful career mainly during the first half of the 1970s, producing numerous hit singles including "Awazu ni Aishite", "Uwasa no Onna","Soshite, Kōbe", "Nakanoshima Blues" and "Tokyo Sabaku". They lost popularity after the departure of their frontman in the late 1980s, and their career went into hiatus after the band lineup was radically altered around the 1990s.

After the band's founder died of lung cancer in 2006, the remaining members, including Maekawa, reunited.

Band members

Discography

Charting singles on the Japanese Oricon

 The group released over 50 singles until Kiyoshi Maekawa left the band in 1987, and those sales have been estimated more than 5.9 million copies.

Kōhaku Uta Gassen Appearances

References

Japanese pop music groups
Musical groups established in 1967
Japanese boy bands